The 2020 elections for the Florida House of Representatives took place on Tuesday, November 3, 2020 to elect representatives from all 120 districts. The Republican Party has held a House majority since 1997.

The elections for U.S. President, U.S. House of Representatives, and the state Florida Senate were also held on this date.

The Republicans gained 7 seats while the Democrats lost 4 in the State House.

Overview

Closest races 
Seats where the margin of victory was under 10%:
 
 
 
 
 
  gain
 
  gain
 
 
   
 
  
 
 
 
 
  gain

Predictions

Primary Election polling
District 4 - Republican

District 27 - Republican

District 53 - Republican

District 55 - Republican

District 76 - Republican

District 78 - Republican

Retiring incumbents

Democrats
Loranne Ausley, District 9 (term-limited, running for SD-3)
Clovis Watson, District 20 (term-limited, running for Alachua Co. Sheriff)
John Cortes, District 43 (retiring, running for Osceola Co. Clerk of Courts)
Bruce Antone, District 46 (term-limited, running for Orange Co. School Board District 5)
Amy Mercado, District 48 (retiring, running for Orange Co. Property Appraiser)
Adam Hattersley, District 59 (retiring, running for CD-15)
Wengay Newton, District 70 (retiring, running for Pinellas Co. Commission District 7)
Margaret Good, District 72  (retiring, running for CD-16)
Tina Polsky, District 81 (retiring, running for SD-29)
Shevrin Jones, District 101 (term-limited, running for SD-35)
Sharon Pritchett, District 102 (term-limited, running for Miami Gardens Mayor)
Richard Stark, District 104 (term-limited, running for Weston mayor)
Barbara Watson, District  107 (term-limited running for SD-35)
Javier Fernandez, District 114 (retiring, running for SD-39)
Kionne McGhee, District 117 (term-limited, running Miami-Dade Co. Commission District 9)

Republicans
Mel Ponder, District 4 (retiring, running for Okaloosa County Commission district 5)
Travis Cummings, District 18 (term limited)
Charlie Stone, District 22 (term limited)
David Santiago, District 27 (term limited)
Jennifer Sullivan, District 31 (term limited)
Mike La Rosa, District 42 ( term limited)
Cary Pigman, District 55 (term limited)
Ray Rodrigues, District 76 (term limited, running for SD-27)
Dane Eagle, District 77 (term limited, running for CD-19)
Heather Fitzenhagen, District 78 (term limited, running for SD-27)
Byron Donalds, District 80 (term limited, running CD-19)
MaryLynn Magar, District 82 (term limited)
Ana Maria Rodriguez, District 105 (retiring, running for SD-39)
José R. Oliva, District 110 (term limited)
Holly Merrill Raschein, District 120 (term limited)

Incumbents defeated

Republicans 
Mike Hill, District 1 (defeated in primary by Michelle Salzman)

Democrats 
 Kimberly Daniels, District 14 (defeated in primary by Angie Nixon)
 Al Jacquet, District 88 (defeated in primary by Omari Hardy)

General Election Polling

District 15

District 21

District 26

District 36

District 55

District 59

District 60

District 64

District 69

District 72

District 89

District 93

Results

State house districts that cover more than one county will have a "Results by county" subsection.

District 1

District 2

Results by county

District 3

District 4

District 5 
Incumbent Brad Drake ran unopposed in the general election and the election was canceled. He was re-elected.

District 6

District 7

District 8 
Incumbent Ramon Alexander ran unopposed in the general election and the election was canceled. He was re-elected.

District 9

District 10

Results by county

District 11

Results by county

District 12

District 13 
Incumbent Tracie Davis ran unopposed in the general election and the election was canceled. She was re-elected.

District 14 
Angie Nixon defeated incumbent Kimberly Daniels in the primary. She ran unopposed in the general election and the election was canceled. She was elected.

District 15

District 16

District 17

District 18

District 19

District 20 
Yvonne Hayes Hinson ran unopposed in the general election and the election was canceled. She was elected.

District 21

Results by county

District 22

District 23

District 24

Results by county

District 25

District 26

District 27

District 28

District 29

District 30

Results by county

District 31

Results by county

District 32

District 33

District 34

District 35

District 36

District 37

District 38

District 39

District 40

District 41

District 42

District 43 
Kristen Arrington ran unopposed. The election was canceled and she got elected.

District 44

District 45 
Incumbent Kamia Brown ran unopposed and the election was canceled. She was re-elected.

District 46 
Travaris McCurdy ran unopposed. The election was canceled and he was elected.

District 47

District 48

District 49

District 50

District 51

District 52

District 53

District 54

District 55

District 56

District 57

District 58

District 59

District 60

District 61 
Incumbent Dianne Hart ran unopposed in the general election. The election was canceled and was re-elected.

District 62

District 63 
Incumbent Fentrice Driskell ran unopposed in the general election. The election was canceled and she was re-elected.

District 64

District 65

District 66

District 67

District 68

District 69

District 70 
Michele Rayner ran unopposed in the general election. The election was canceled and she was elected.

District 71

District 72

District 73

District 74

District 75

District 76

District 77

District 78

District 79

District 80

District 81

District 82

District 83

District 84

District 85

District 86

District 87

District 88

District 89

District 90

District 91

District 92

District 93

District 94 
Incumbent Bobby DuBose ran unopposed and the general election was canceled. He was re-elected.

District 95 
Incumbent Anika Omphroy ran unopposed and the general election was canceled. She was re-elected.

District 96 
Christine Hunschofsky ran unopposed and the general election was canceled. She was re-elected.

District 97 
Incumbent Dan Daley ran unopposed and the general election was canceled. He was re-elected.

District 98 
Incumbent Michael Gottlieb ran unopposed and the general election was canceled. He was re-elected.

District 99 
Incumbent Evan Jenne ran unopposed and the general election was canceled. He was re-elected.

District 100 
Incumbent Joe Geller ran unopposed and the general election was canceled. He was re-elected.

District 101

District 102 
Felicia Robinson ran unopposed and the general election was canceled. She was elected.

District 103

District 104

District 105

District 106

District 107 
Christopher Benjamin ran unopposed in the general election and the election was canceled. He was elected.

District 108 
Incumbent Dotie Joseph ran unopposed in the general election and the election was canceled. She was re-elected.

District 109 
Incumbent James Bush ran unopposed in the general election and the election was canceled. He was elected.

District 110

District 111

District 112

District 113 
Incumbent Michael Grieco ran unopposed in the general election and the election was canceled. He was elected.

District 114

District 115

District 116

District 117 
Kevin Chambliss ran unopposed in the general election and the election was canceled. He was elected.

District 118

District 119

District 120

See also
 2020 Florida elections
 2020 Florida Senate election
 Politics of Florida
 Political party strength in Florida
 Florida Democratic Party
 Republican Party of Florida
 Government of Florida

Notes

Partisan clients

References

Further reading

External links 
 Florida Elections Commission government website
  (State affiliate of the U.S. League of Women Voters)
 
 
 
 

Florida House of Representatives
Florida House
Florida House of Representatives elections